Criminal: Germany is a 2019 German-language police procedural anthology series created by George Kay and Jim Field Smith, and starring Eva Meckbach, Sylvester Groth and Florence Kasumba. Criminal: Germany is part of Netflix's Criminal, an anthology series consisting of twelve episodes with three episodes each set across four countries filmed in local languages – France, Spain, Germany and the UK.

It was released on 20 September 2019 on Netflix.

Premise
Set within the confines of a police interrogation room, German investigators engage in intense games of psychological cat-and-mouse with their accused suspects to find the answers they need in order to solve their cases.

Cast

Accused
 Peter Kurth -  Jochen Müller
  -  Yilmaz Yussef
 Nina Hoss -  Claudia Hartmann

Police
 Eva Meckbach -  Nadine Keller
 Sylvester Groth - Detective Chief Inspector Karl Schulz
 Florence Kasumba - Antje Borchert
  - Martin Ludwig
 Jonathan Berlin -  Stefan Proska

Lawyers
 Christian Berkel - Dr. Marquardt

Episodes

Production
All twelve episodes were filmed at Netflix's production hub at Ciudad de la Tele in Madrid.

Release
Criminal: Germany was released on 20 September 2019 on Netflix.

References

External links
 
 

German-language Netflix original programming
Television shows set in Germany
Television shows filmed in Spain
2010s drama television series
2019 German television series debuts